The Guelph Nighthawks were a Canadian professional basketball team based in Guelph, Ontario, Canada, that competed in the Canadian Elite Basketball League. The team played home games at the Sleeman Centre.

History
On June 12, 2018, it was announced that the team would be called the Guelph Nighthawks.  Guelph joins Hamilton Honey Badgers, Edmonton Stingers, Niagara River Lions, Saskatchewan Rattlers, and Fraser Valley Bandits as one of the six original franchises for the inaugural season of the CEBL. 

On August 17, 2022, it was announced that the team will be relocating to Calgary, Alberta for the 2023 CEBL season.

Players

Current roster

Notable players
 Chad Brown (born 1996), basketball player in the Israeli Basketball Premier League
Michale Kyser (born 1991), basketball player for Hapoel Holon in the Israeli Basketball Premier League

Season-by-season record

References

External links
 Official website

Sport in Guelph
2018 establishments in Ontario
Basketball teams in Ontario
Basketball teams established in 2018
Canadian Elite Basketball League teams